Havrilla is a Slovak surname. Notable people with the surname include:

Dennis Havrilla (born 1987), American football player
Jo Ann Havrilla, American actress

Slovak-language surnames